Yeniköy ('New Village' in Turkish, written يڭى كوى in Ottoman Turkish), sometimes written as two words Yeni Köy,  may refer to one of the following places:

In Turkey
 Yeniköy, Istanbul, a neighborhood in Sarıyer district of Istanbul, Turkey
 Yeniköy Synagogue, a synagogue in the neighborhood

 Yeniköy, Adıyaman
 Yeniköy, Alaca
 Yeniköy, Alanya
 Yeniköy, Aydın
 Yeniköy (Dalama), Aydın
 Yeniköy, Babadağ
 Yeniköy, Bala
 Yeniköy, Bartın
 Yeniköy, Batman
 Yeniköy, Bayat
 Yeniköy, Bayburt
 Yeniköy, Bayramiç
 Yeniköy, Besni
 Yeniköy, Bigadiç
 Yeniköy, Bilecik
 Yeniköy, Bolu
 Yeniköy, Bozdoğan
 Yeniköy, Bursa
 Yeniköy, Çerkeş
 Yeniköy, Çilimli
 Yeniköy, Çine
 Yeniköy, Çüngüş
 Yeniköy, Dodurga
 Yeniköy, Emirdağ
 Yeniköy, Ergani
 Yeniköy, Erzincan
 Yeniköy, Ezine
 Yeniköy, Gazipaşa
 Yeniköy, Gelibolu
 Yeniköy, Gölbaşı
 Yeniköy, Göle
 Yeniköy, Göynücek
 Yeniköy, Göynük
 Yeniköy, Gündoğmuş
 Yeniköy, Hamamözü
 Yeniköy, Haymana
 Yeniköy, Hınıs
 Yeniköy, Kale
 Yeniköy, Karacasu
 Yeniköy, Karakoçan
 Yeniköy, Karayazı
 Yeniköy, Kaş
 Yeniköy, Koçarlı
 Yeniköy, Kovancılar
 Yeniköy, Kozan
 Yeniköy, Kurucaşile
 Yeniköy, Kuşadası
 Yeniköy, Manavgat
 Yeniköy, Manyas
 Yeniköy, Mersin
 Yeniköy, Ödemiş
 Yeniköy, Otlukbeli
 Yeniköy, Pasinler
 Yeniköy, Posof
 Yeniköy, Refahiye
 Yeniköy, Saimbeyli
 Yeniköy, Şanlıurfa
 Yeniköy, Sason
 Yeniköy, Silvan
 Yeniköy, Söke
 Yeniköy, Tarsus
 Yeniköy, Ulus
 Yeniköy, Yenice
 Yeniköy, Yenişehir
 Yeniköy, Yumurtalık
 Yeniköy, Yüreğir
 Yeniköy, Yusufeli

Formerly named Yeniköy

Greece
 Stavroupoli, Xanthi, Greece
 Plevroma, Pella, Greece
 Eleftherochori, Kilkis
 Argillos, Kozani
 Provatas, Serres, Greece

North Macedonia
 Novo Selo Municipality